Shahid Ahmad Dehlvi (Urdu: ‎; Shāhid Aḥmad Dihlavī; 22 May 1906 - 27 May 1967) was a Pakistani author, editor and translator. He was conferred with the Pride of Performance for his literary services in 1963. He was the grandson of Urdu novel writer and religious reformer Nazir Ahmad Dehlvi.

Biography 
Shahid Ahmad was born on 22 May 1906 in Delhi, British India to Bashiruddin Ahmad Dehlvi, son of Nazir Ahmad Dehlvi in a religious family. In 1930 after completing his education, Dehlvi started the monthly Saqi (ur), a literary magazine. Dehlvi's articles in the monthly Saqi portrayed the vanishing culture of Delhi. He believed that the old Delhi, which was considered a symbol of Indo-Muslim culture, was ruined because of the bloodshed of Independence. Aqeel Abbas Jafari has collected his articles in a book. 

Dehlvi also ran the Delhi branch of the Progressive Writers' Association and started a literary journal called Shahjahan devoted to progressive literature.

Dehlvi had interest in classical music and learnt the art under the guidance of Ustad Chand Khan, belonging to Delhi gharana (The Delhi School of Music) and participated in music programmes on All India Radio, by the name of S Ahmad. After that partition of India, he moved to Karachi where he worked for Radio Pakistan.

In 1963, he was conferred with the Pride of Performance award by the Government of Pakistan.

Shahid Ahmad Dehlvi died on 27 May 1967 in Karachi and was buried in the Gulshan-e-Iqbal cemetery.

Literary works
Shahid's works include:
 Ujra diya
 Chand adbī shak̲h̲ṣiyatain̲
 Bazam-e-khush nafsau

Notes

References

Cited sources

External links 
 A tale of changing times at Dawn
 Shahid Dehlvi — the writer & the musician
 Shahid Ahmed Dehlvi at Rekhta
 Books by Shahid (Urdu) at Rekhta

1906 births
1967 deaths
Urdu-language children's writers
Pakistani magazine editors
Urdu-language essayists
Recipients of the Pride of Performance
Pakistani Muslims
Writers from Delhi
Writers from Karachi
Urdu-language writers from Pakistan
Pakistani people of Indian descent